The Volcanic Legacy Scenic Byway is a scenic highway and All-American Road in the U.S. states of California and Oregon. It is composed of two separate National Scenic Byways, the Volcanic Legacy Scenic Byway - Oregon and Volcanic Legacy Scenic Byway - California. The latter also wholly includes the Lassen Scenic Byway.

Route description

Oregon section

Starting at U.S. Route 97 south of Chemult, the byway heads west on Oregon Route 138 before turning south on Oregon Route 209 into Crater Lake National Park, where Crater Lake fills the caldera of the destroyed Mount Mazama volcano. The byway includes Rim Drive which circumnavigates the lake.

South of Crater Lake, the byway continues down Oregon Route 62, with Mount Scott on the east, to Fort Klamath, whereupon it heads west on Weed Road to Sevenmile Road, then south on West Side Road along the edge of the Upper Klamath National Wildlife Refuge and Upper Klamath Lake. The byway then passes Mount McLoughlin on the east as it joins Oregon Route 140 to Klamath Falls.

From there, the route proceeds southwards on US 97, between Bear Valley National Wildlife Refuge and Lower Klamath National Wildlife Refuge to the California border.

California section

Just south of the border, north of the town of Dorris, California, a spur route heads east on State Route 161 and south on Route 139 to Tulelake. This section then turns west through the town along E Street/East West Road, then south down Hill Road through the Tule Lake National Wildlife Refuge on the western shore of Tule Lake, an area of wetlands and marshes, which greatly contrast with the harsh landscape of the Lava Beds National Monument, just ahead. The monument lies on the northeast flank of the Medicine Lake Volcano, the largest volcano (total area covered) in the Cascades.

The main byway continues south on US 97 around Mount Shasta, the second-tallest volcano in the contiguous US, to the city of Weed, which is marked by a large totem pole that stands off of the intersection of Hwy 97 and Weed Blvd. Along Hwy 97 just north of Weed is Pluto's Cave, a collapsed lava tube that individuals can explore on their own. It then briefly joins Interstate 5, passing Black Butte, before heading east on Route 89 in the city of Mount Shasta and heads on out to McCloud.

Besides volcanoes, the byway passes near a number of waterfalls. The McCloud River Falls are north of Lake McCloud, which lies south of the highway, near the town of McCloud. McArthur-Burney Falls Memorial State Park is further along Route 89 at Lake Britton.

Passing by a number of smaller volcanoes, Burney Mountain and Sugarloaf Peak, the byway makes its way south where it circles Lassen Peak. At Route 44, the byway heads southeast to Route 36, where it turns west. There is also a bypass along Route 147 and Route 89 around Lake Almanor, rejoining Route 36 in the town of Chester. The byway continues along Routes 36/89 and follows Route 89 after they split through Lassen Volcanic National Park. On the other side of the park, Route 89 joins Route 44 eastward, returning to the starting point of the loop. This loop itself is designated the Lassen Scenic Byway.

See also 

 Rim Drive

References

External links
Volcanic Legacy Scenic Byway web site

State Scenic Highway System (California)
Scenic highways in Oregon
Volcanism of California
Volcanism of Oregon
Crater Lake National Park
Roads in Lassen County, California
Roads in Plumas County, California
Roads in Siskiyou County, California
Roads in Shasta County, California
Roads in Tehama County, California
Protected areas of Lassen County, California
Protected areas of Plumas County, California
Protected areas of Shasta County, California
Transportation in Klamath County, Oregon
All-American Roads
Protected areas of Tehama County, California
U.S. Route 97
Named highways in California